Hillside Stadium is a multi-purpose, fully lit stadium located next to Thompson Rivers University in Kamloops, British Columbia. It is the home of the Thompson Rivers WolfPack, Kamloops Broncos of the Canadian Junior Football League, and the Kamloops Excel of the Pacific Coast Soccer League. It was a FIFA Recommended 1-Star installation when originally completed, but that has since expired. Besides hosting field events, it has a rubberized 400m running track and facilities for other track and field events. The stadium has aluminum bleachers, with a permanent seating capacity of 1,060. Hillside Stadium hosted the track and field events at the 1993 Canada Summer Games.

In addition, there are two additional soccer fields and track and field facilities. As well as the new fieldhouse which includes a 200m indoor track, gymnastics space, multi-function gym, and classrooms. The complex also includes the Canada Games Aquatic Centre.

References

External links
 Satellite view of Hillside Stadium on Google Maps

Canadian football venues in British Columbia
Soccer venues in British Columbia
Sports venues in Kamloops
Athletics (track and field) venues in Canada
Multi-purpose stadiums in British Columbia
Canada Games venues